Lavoltidine (INN, USAN, BAN; previously known as loxtidine, code name AH-23,844) is a highly potent and selective H2 receptor antagonist which was under development by Glaxo Wellcome (now GlaxoSmithKline) as a treatment for gastroesophageal reflux disease but was discontinued due to the discovery that it produced gastric carcinoid tumors in rodents.

See also
 H2 receptor antagonist
 Sufotidine (analogous sequence in which sulfone replaces the hydroxyl group)

References

Abandoned drugs
Primary alcohols
Amines
H2 receptor antagonists
1-Piperidinyl compounds
Triazoles
Phenol ethers